Remko Bicentini (born 20 February 1968) is a Dutch-Curaçaoan football manager and former professional player who is head coach of the Curaçao national team.

Playing career
Bicentini, who played as a central defender, began his professional career in the Netherlands with NEC, making 24 appearances in the 1986–87 season.

Managerial career
In 2009, Bicentini was appointed as the head coach of the Netherlands Antilles national team.

In September 2016, Bicentini became the head coach of the Curaçao national team, replacing Patrick Kluivert. He previously served as Kluivert's assistant.

In June 2017, Bicentini coached Curaçao to their maiden Caribbean Cup (final edition) title. He also helped the island qualify for three straight CONCACAF Gold Cups. He left Curaçao in August 2020 and was replaced by Guus Hiddink. 

In February 2021, Bicentini joined Canada coach John Herdman's staff as an assistant coach. In August 2022 he returned to his role as head coach of Curaçao.

Personal life
His father is former NEC player Moises Bicentini. Bicentini is founder and chairman of the Dutch Caribbean Stars.

Notes

External links
 De Trouwe Honden

1968 births
Living people
Footballers from Nijmegen
Dutch people of Curaçao descent
Association football central defenders
Curaçao footballers
Dutch footballers
Dutch Antillean footballers
NEC Nijmegen players
De Treffers players
Eerste Divisie players
Dutch football managers
Dutch Antillean football managers
Netherlands Antilles national football team managers
2017 CONCACAF Gold Cup managers
Dutch expatriate football managers
2019 CONCACAF Gold Cup managers
SV AWC players